Lufeng Town is a town and the county seat of Xupu County in Hunan, China. Its seat of local government is at Shengli Community.()

References

Xupu
County seats in Hunan